Stéphane Tyssier (born 1 September 1959) is a French sports shooter. He competed at the 1984 Summer Olympics, the 1988 Summer Olympics and the 1992 Summer Olympics.

References

1959 births
Living people
French male sport shooters
Olympic shooters of France
Shooters at the 1984 Summer Olympics
Shooters at the 1988 Summer Olympics
Shooters at the 1992 Summer Olympics
Sport shooters from Paris
20th-century French people